The Northern Ireland national netball team represent Northern Ireland in international netball tournaments such as the Netball World Cup, the Commonwealth Games, the European Netball Championship and the Nations Cup. The team was founded in 1955. Northern Ireland won the Nations Cup in both 2009 and 2015  and were silver medallists at the 2012 and 2017 European Netball Championships. As of 21 July 2019, Northern Ireland are listed 11th on the INF World Rankings. Since 2019 the team has been sponsored by PricewaterhouseCoopers and is sometimes referred to as the PwC Warriors.

Tournament history

Netball World Cup
Northern Ireland played in the inaugural 1963 World Netball Championships and finished in 11th place. Their best performance in the tournament came in 1983 when they finished seventh. In 2019 Northern Ireland played in  their twelfth Netball World Cup.

Commonwealth Games
Northern Ireland made their debut at the Commonwealth Games in 2014. As part of their preparations for the 2014 Commonwealth Games, Northern Ireland formed a partnership with Team Northumbria. This saw seven Northern Ireland internationals – Oonagh McCullough, Fionnuala Toner, Caroline O'Hanlon, Gemma Gibney, Michelle Drayne, Noleen Lennon and Niamh Cooper – play for Team Northumbria during the 2014 Netball Superleague season. With Kate Carpenter taking charge of both teams, Northern Ireland and Team Northumbria also shared a coach. In the tournament itself, they eventually finished seventh after defeating Wales by 58–36 in a classification match. Northern Ireland made their second appearance at the Commonwealth Games in 2018. Team captain, Caroline O'Hanlon, carried the flag of Northern Ireland during the 2018 Commonwealth Games opening ceremony. Northern Ireland eventually finished eighth after losing to Malawi by 60–52 in a classification match.

European Netball Championship
Northern Ireland have played regularly in the European Netball Championship. Their best performances came in 2012 and 2017 when they finished second and won silver medals on both occasions.

Nations Cup
Northern Ireland won the Nations Cup in both 2009 and 2015

World University Netball Championship
Northern Ireland represented the Colleges and Universities Sports Association of Ireland at the 2012 World University Netball Championship. It was initially planned that Ireland would send an All-Ireland team, featuring players from both Northern Ireland and the Republic of Ireland. However no players from the Republic were selected for the final squad. As a result, it was a Northern Ireland team, in effect, that competed in the tournament.

Players

2019 Netball World Cup squad

2018 Commonwealth Games squad

Head coaches

Honours
Nations Cup
Winners: 2009, 2015: 2 
European Netball Championship
Runner up: 2012, 2017: 2

References

 
National netball teams of Europe
Netball in Northern Ireland
Netball teams in the United Kingdom
 
1955 establishments in Northern Ireland